Rentonium bicolor is a species of beetles in the family Trogossitidae.

Distribution
New Zealand.

References

Beetles described in 2014
Trogossitidae
Terrestrial biota of New Zealand